The Portomaso Business Tower (often referred to by locals as simply "Portomaso") is a high-rise office building in Malta. The tower stands in the Portomaso section of St. Julian's, a town just north of Malta's capital city, Valletta. It became Malta's tallest building upon its completion, and remained so until 2020 when it was surpassed by the still-under-construction Mercury Tower, also in St. Julian's. 

The first six floors of the Tower have  of floor space, while the remaining floors have  each. The main floor is occupied by a shopping centre while the top floor of the building is a nightclub with balconies affording views of the island nation.

The tower is located close to Paceville, and it overlooks the Portomaso Marina. The surrounding area has many hotels, apartments, bars and restaurants, shops and a tree-lined promenade.

The Portomaso Casino is located in the Tower, and was the venue for the 2012 and 2013 Battle of Malta Poker Tournament.

See also
List of tallest buildings in Malta

References

External links

Portomaso Business Tower at Emporis

Office buildings completed in 2001
Skyscrapers in Malta
St. Julian's, Malta
Skyscraper office buildings